Ramirezella is a small genus of flowering plants in the family Fabaceae. It belongs to the subfamily Faboideae.

References

Phaseoleae
Fabaceae genera